Type 0 may refer to:

Aircraft
Type 0 Carrier Fighter Mitsubishi A6M, a Japanese fighter aircraft
Type 0 Observation Seaplane Mitsubishi F1M, a Japanese reconnaissance seaplane
Type 0 Reconnaissance Seaplane Aichi E13A, a Japanese reconnaissance seaplane
Type 0 Small Reconnaissance Seaplane Yokosuka E14Y, a Japanese submarine-based reconnaissance seaplane
Type 0 Transport Showa/Nakajima L2D, a Japanese transport aircraft

Watercraft
Type-0 heavy lift vessel Dockwise Vanguard, a semi-submersible heavy lift ship

Media
 Final Fantasy Type-0, a video game

Science
Glycogen storage disease type 0, a disease
Type 0 civilization in the Kardashev scale of technological advancement
Type-0 language or Recursively enumerable language in the Chomsky hierarchy of formal languages
Type 0 string theory, a model of string theory

See also
 Type O blood type
 Typo (disambiguation)